Fox-1D, AO-92 or AMSAT OSCAR 92 is an American amateur radio satellite. Fox-1D is a 1U CubeSat developed and built by AMSAT-NA. Fox-1D carries a single-channel transponder for mode U/V in FM. Fox-1D has an L-band converter (the AMSAT L-band downshifter experiment), which allows the FM transponder to be switched on an uplink in the  band.

To enable it to launch under NASA's ELaNa (Educational Launch of Nanosatellites) program, the satellite continues to carry the following scientific and technical payloads:

 High Energy Radiation CubeSat (HERCI);
 Camera Experiment;
 MEMS GYRO Experiment.

The satellite has a single whip antenna for the 70 cm and 23 cm bands (uplink), as well as an antenna for the 2m band (downlink).

Mission
The satellite was launched on January 12, 2018 at 03:59 UTC with a PSLV XL rocket, along with the main payloads Cartosat-2F, NovaSAR-S, and 31 other small satellites from the Satish Dhawan Space Center, India. At 05:17 UTC, the antennas were deployed over the North Pole and the satellite began to work. At 05:28 UTC the first telemetry was received and commissioning occurred over  approximately two weeks. Currently, Fox-1D is rarely operational, as the AMSAT Engineering team believes that there are serious battery capacity issues.   The transponder is occasionally turned on, but will usually default into "Safe Mode" at the next eclipse.

See also

 OSCAR

References

External links
 Project OSCAR

Satellites orbiting Earth
Amateur radio satellites
Spacecraft launched in 2018